Gordon Neil Spencer 'Mouse' Cleaver,  (27 April 1910 – 24 December 1994) was a Royal Air Force fighter pilot and flying ace (with 7 confirmed "kills") during the Battle of Britain in the Second World War. After the war he played a role in developing artificial lenses to restore sight.

Early life
Gordon Cleaver was born in Stanmore, Middlesex and was educated at Harrow School. Cleaver was the inaugural winner of the Hahnenkammrennen Combined in 1931, and for 91 years was the only British skier to have won at Kitzbühel. In the same race was Roger Bushell, of Great Escape fame, who finished in 14th place.

Air Force career
Cleaver joined the Auxiliary Air Force in 1937, serving with No. 601 Squadron RAF, also known as "The Millionaires' Squadron".

Cleaver went with the squadron to Merville, France on 16 May 1940. On 18 May, Cleaver, with F/L Archibald Hope, brought down a Do-17 of 2/KG 76 west of Mons, the crew being captured. The next day, Cleaver's Hurricane was hit by debris from a He-111 that attacked over Douai and he force-landed near Lille. 601 Squadron was then transferred back to the UK.

On 27 May, he claimed two Bf 110s destroyed over Dunkirk. Cleaver next claimed a Ju-87 destroyed and a He-111 'probable' on 11 July, a Bf 109 destroyed on 26 July, a Bf 109 and a Bf 110 both probables on 11 August and a Bf 110 probably destroyed on 13 August.

On 15 August 1940, Cleaver was shot down during combat over Winchester.  The perspex canopy of his Hurricane was hit by cannon shells and the perspex fragments shattered into his face and both eyes.  Cleaver baled out and landed by parachute near Lower Upham outside Southampton.  On arrival at Salisbury Hospital, it was discovered that he had been blinded in his right eye and had seriously reduced vision in the left.  This ended his flying career.

Cleaver was awarded the Distinguished Flying Cross

Despite his injuries, Cleaver was able to remain in the RAF.  He officially transferred to the Administrative Branch on 27 May 1941. He was released on medical grounds from the RAF on 9 November 1943, retaining the rank of squadron leader.

List of air victories

Eye operations and later life
Following the incident over Winchester on 15 August 1940, Cleaver had 18 operations on his eyes and face at several hospitals in the South of England.  He had flown that sortie without Airman's Goggles. Thus his face and eyes were unprotected from the shards of metal and Perspex from the Hurricane canopy. He recovered some sight in one eye but was blinded in the other. It was during the course of this treatment that Harold Ridley noticed that the Perspex in Cleaver's eye caused no inflammation. After the war, Ridley used this observation to inform his work on the development of the intraocular lens. He requested the Rayner company to manufacture a lens from ICI Perspex. The first intraocular lens implant surgery performed by Harold Ridley in 1949 using a lens made of ICI Perspex CQ (Clinical Quality).

Later in life, Cleaver developed cataract in his remaining eye. In the 1980s, he had the cataract removed by English surgeon Eric Arnott and received an intraocular lens. Thus his sight was restored thanks to a medical device developed after observation on his eyes 40 years earlier. The implant he received was made of similar material to the Perspex which had entered his eyes in 1940.

Legacy
The organizers of Hahnenkamm named a cup after Cleaver, first presented in 2006.

In 2013, a portrayal of Cleaver's final dogfight and his connection to Harold Ridley's invention of the artificial intraocular lens were highlighted in a book called Saving Sight: An eye surgeon's look at life behind the mask and the heroes who changed the way we see, by Andrew Lam, M.D.

Film and TV
On 6 January 2016, during the television programme The One Show on BBC 1, a short film was shown about the link between Gordon Cleaver and Sir Harold Ridley. Using archive film and photographic material and an interview with Sir Harold's son Nicholas Ridley, the Chairman of the Ridley Eye Foundation, Michael Mosley reported on the "Eureka moment" that led to the invention of the intraocular lens. The film was made by ICON FILMS, based in Bristol, England.

References

1910 births
1994 deaths
British World War II flying aces
English male alpine skiers
People educated at Harrow School
People from Stanmore
Recipients of the Distinguished Flying Cross (United Kingdom)
Royal Air Force officers
Royal Air Force pilots of World War II
The Few
Military personnel from Middlesex